Holdom is an elevated station on the Millennium Line of Metro Vancouver's SkyTrain rapid transit system. The station is located at the intersection of Lougheed Highway and Holdom Avenue in Burnaby, British Columbia, Canada. Located adjacent to the station is a residential development with two high-rise towers, low-rise units, and several commercial shops.

History
Holdom station was opened in 2002 as part of the original Millennium Line project.

Structure and design
Holdom station was designed by the architecture firm Hotson Bakker Architects, and its structure is topped with a sculpture, by glass artist Graham Scott, which includes square lanterns made of sandblasted mirror that is lit by stage-quality lighting. The colour of the lights are controlled by a computer, continually and randomly changing.

Station information

Transit connections

Holdom station provides connections within Burnaby, Vancouver and the Tri-City area. The following bus routes serve the station:

References

Millennium Line stations
Railway stations in Canada opened in 2002
Buildings and structures in Burnaby
2002 establishments in British Columbia